Unravelling is the third studio album by the Scottish indie rock band We Were Promised Jetpacks. It was released on 6 October 2014 in the United Kingdom and 14 October 2014 in the United States.

Track listing

Release history

References

We Were Promised Jetpacks albums
2014 albums
FatCat Records albums